Orotidine 5'-monophosphate (OMP), also known as orotidylic acid, is a pyrimidine nucleotide which is the last intermediate in the biosynthesis of uridine monophosphate. OMP is formed from orotate and phosphoribosyl pyrophosphate by the enzyme orotate phosphoribosyltransferase.

In humans, the enzyme UMP synthase converts OMP into uridine 5'- monophosphate. If UMP synthase is defective, orotic aciduria can result.

References

Nucleotides
Pyrimidinediones